WICD or Wicd may refer to:

 WICD (TV), a television station (channel 15) licensed to Champaign, Illinois, United States
 a defunct television station in Urbana, Illinois
 Wicd, a network manager software for Linux systems

it:WICD